Wythe County is a county located in the southwestern part of the U.S. state of Virginia. As of the 2020 census, the population was 28,290. Its county seat is Wytheville.

History

Wythe County was formed from Montgomery County in 1790. It was named after George Wythe, the first Virginian signer of the Declaration of Independence. During the Civil War the Battle of Cove Mountain was fought in the county.

Prior to Wythe County's creation, what is now the Wythe County community of Austinville served as the county seat for Fincastle County, an extinct Virginia county whose borders stretched from Roanoke, Virginia, to the Mississippi River – a county roughly the size of half the State of Texas.

Wythe County's Austinville community was founded by Stephen and his brother Moses Austin, father of the famous Stephen F. Austin.  In the 1790s the Austins took over the mines that produced lead and zinc; the town was named for the Austin surname, and not for any one particular Austin of the brothers who bore that surname.  Lead was mined and shipped throughout the fledgling country; lead shot was also produced. Located near Fosters Falls, Jackson Ferry Shot Tower still stands as a testament to the citizens of Wythe County.  Lead was hoisted to the top of the tower using block and tackle and oxen.  The lead was melted in a retort and then poured through a sieve at the top of the tower. The droplets of molten lead would become round during the 150-foot descent.  The shot would collect in a kettle of water and slave laborers would enter through a 110-foot access tunnel located near the bank of the New River to retrieve the shot from the kettle. The lead mines closed in 1982 due to new United States Environmental Protection Agency standards and the lack of a market for lead. The mines have since filled with water; the main shaft extended in excess of 1100 feet straight down.

On August 15, 1926, the lynching of Raymond Byrd occurred at the Wythe County jail.

Another notable area within the county is the unincorporated community of Fort Chiswell - named for a French and Indian War era fort. The fort and its surrounding buildings served as the county seat until the incorporated town of Wytheville was established approximately 10 miles to the west. The fort fell into disrepair and its ruins were covered over when the intersection of I-77 and I-81 was constructed in the 1970s. A pyramid marker now stands in the approximate location of the former fort. The community was named for Colonel John Chiswell who helped establish the lead mines (1757) prior to the Austin's purchase.

Wythe County's location, at the confluence of I-81 and I-77 which is, incidentally, a wrong-way concurrency, has led to its growth for industry and tourism.  Recently Gatorade and Pepsi manufacturing facilities have located here, primarily due to the ease of access and central location along the Eastern seabord. There are a variety of travel-related businesses including several hundred hotel rooms, several truck stops, and restaurants located in the county.
Tourism takes a variety of different forms in Wythe County.  There are numerous opportunities for those that enjoy outdoor activities including a variety of trails, campgrounds, and parks in the area.  Its first winery opened in 2006 and a second opened in 2007.  A dinner theatre is located in the county seat, Wytheville.

Geography
The county is intersected by the New River. The land is mostly an elevated plateau, lying between Iron Mountain on the south and Walker's Mountain on the northwest. The soil is generally fertile. Iron ore, lead, bituminous coal, limestone, and gypsum are very abundant, and there are traces of silver found in the lead mines.

Adjacent counties
 Bland County - north
 Smyth County - west
 Grayson County - south
 Carroll County - southeast
 Pulaski County - east

National protected areas
 Jefferson National Forest (part)
 Mount Rogers National Recreation Area (part)

Major highways
  (future)

Demographics

2020 census

Note: the US Census treats Hispanic/Latino as an ethnic category. This table excludes Latinos from the racial categories and assigns them to a separate category. Hispanics/Latinos can be of any race.

2000 Census
As of the census of 2000, there were 27,599 people, 11,511 households, and 8,103 families residing in the county.  The population density was 60 people per square mile (23/km2).  There were 12,744 housing units at an average density of 28 per square mile (11/km2).  The racial makeup of the county was 95.76% White, 2.87% Black or African American, 0.16% Native American, 0.38% Asian, 0.01% Pacific Islander, 0.24% from other races, and 0.58% from two or more races.  0.57% of the population were Hispanic or Latino of any race.

There were 11,511 households, out of which 28.90% had children under the age of 18 living with them, 56.20% were married couples living together, 10.50% had a female householder with no husband present, and 29.60% were non-families. 26.30% of all households were made up of individuals, and 11.70% had someone living alone who was 65 years of age or older.  The average household size was 2.36 and the average family size was 2.83.

In the county, the population was spread out, with 21.80% under the age of 18, 7.60% from 18 to 24, 28.90% from 25 to 44, 25.90% from 45 to 64, and 15.80% who were 65 years of age or older.  The median age was 39 years. For every 100 females there were 91.40 males.  For every 100 females age 18 and over, there were 88.30 males.

The median income for a household in the county was $32,235, and the median income for a family was $40,188. Males had a median income of $29,053 versus $20,550 for females. The per capita income for the county was $17,639.  About 8.50% of families and 11.00% of the population were below the poverty line, including 12.50% of those under age 18 and 13.40% of those age 65 or over.

Education

Colleges 
 Breckbill Bible College, Grahams Forge
 Blueridge College of Evangelism, Wytheville
 Wytheville Community College, Wytheville

Public high schools
 Fort Chiswell High School, Fort Chiswell
 George Wythe High School, Wytheville
 Rural Retreat High School, Rural Retreat

Private schools
 The Baptist Academy of Rural Retreat, Rural Retreat
 Granite Christian Academy, Wytheville
 Appalachian Christian Academy, Rural Retreat

Government

Board of Supervisors
 District 1 (Blacklick): Brian W. Vaught, Chairman (R)
 District 2 (West Wytheville District): Rolland Cook(R)
 District 3 (East Wytheville District): Ryan Yates Lawson, Vice Chairman  (I)
 District 4 (Fort Chiswell District): James Smith (R)
 District 5 (Lead Mines District): Coy L. McRoberts (D)
 District 6 (Speedwell District): B.G. "Gene" Horney Jr., (D)
 District 7 (Supervisor At-Large): Stacy Terry (R)

Constitutional Officers
 Clerk of the Circuit Court: Jeremiah Musser (R)
 Commissioner of the Revenue: Kathy Vaught (R)
 Commonwealth's Attorney: Mike Jones (R)
 Sheriff: Charles Foster  (R)
 Treasurer: Lori Guynn (D)

Law enforcment

The Wythe County Sheriff's Office (WCSO) is the primary law enforcement agency in Wythe County, Virginia. The sheriff preceding Charles Foster was Keith Dunagan, who had served for nearly 40 years before retiring. Since the establishment of the Wythe County Sheriff's Office, 1 deputy has died in the line of duty, in 1994.

Politics

Communities

Towns
 Rural Retreat
 Wytheville

Census-designated places
 Fort Chiswell
 Ivanhoe
 Max Meadows

Other unincorporated communities
 Austinville
 Cripple Creek
 Crockett
 Speedwell
 Barren Springs

See also
 National Register of Historic Places listings in Wythe County, Virginia

References

 
Virginia counties
1790 establishments in Virginia
Counties of Appalachia